Captain 3rd Rank Valery Mikhailovich Sablin (1 January 1939 – 3 August 1976) was a Soviet Navy officer and a member of the Communist Party. In November 1975, disillusioned by corruption and stagnation in Leonid Brezhnev's Soviet Union, he led a mutiny on the Soviet anti-submarine frigate, Storozhevoy (meaning "Sentry") in the hope of starting a Leninist political revolution in the Soviet Union. His mutiny failed and he was executed for treason nine months later.

Early life
Sablin was born in 1939, the son of a Navy officer. He graduated from the Frunze Naval Institute in Leningrad in 1960 and served in the Soviet Northern Fleet. He was never afraid to openly express his opinions. In 1962, when he was 23, he wrote a letter to Nikita Khrushchev with a request to “rid the Communist Party of sycophants and corrupt elements.” Sablin was lucky and he was just reprimanded. In 1973, he graduated from the Lenin Military-Political Academy and was appointed a political officer.  Officer Nikolay Cherkashin, one of Sablin's colleagues, recalled: He had always thought globally… He tried to deeply understand social phenomena. He was a natural politician.

The mutiny
On 8 November 1975, Captain 3rd Rank Valery Sablin seized the Storozhevoy, a Soviet Burevestnik Class missile frigate, and confined the ship's captain and other officers to the wardroom. Sablin's plan was to take the ship from the Gulf of Riga north into the Gulf of Finland and to Leningrad, through the Neva River, mooring by the decommissioned cruiser Aurora (a symbol of the Russian Revolution), where he would protest by radio and television against the rampant corruption of the Brezhnev era. He planned to say what he thought many were saying privately: that the revolution and motherland were in danger; that the ruling authorities were up to their necks in corruption, demagoguery, graft, and lies, leading the country into an abyss; that the ideals of Communism had been discarded; and that there was a pressing need to revive Leninist principles of justice. Sablin was a strong believer in Leninist values and considered the Soviet system to have essentially "sold out".

A junior officer escaped from confinement and radioed for assistance. When the Storozhevoy cleared the mouth of the Gulf of Riga, ten bomber and reconnaissance airplanes and thirteen warships were in pursuit, firing a number of warning shots across her bows. Several bombs were dropped in front of and behind the ship, as well as cannon fire. Storozhevoy's steering was damaged and she eventually came to a stop. The pursuing vessels then closed in, and the frigate was boarded by Soviet marine commandos. By then, however, Sablin had been shot in his knee and detained by his own crew, who had also unlocked the captain and the other captive officers.

Sablin was charged with treason, court-martialled in June 1976 and found guilty. Although this crime usually carried a 15-year prison sentence, Sablin was executed on 3 August 1976. His second-in-command during the mutiny, Alexander Shein, received an eight-year prison sentence.  The other mutineers were freed.

In 1994, the Military Collegium of the Supreme Court of the Russian Federation reviewed the sentences with a possibility of posthumous rehabilitation. The court partially rehabilitated Sablin rather than fully exonerating him and Shein (who had by that time served his sentence).

Reports of the mutiny in the West
The Kremlin did not want news of the uprising to spread and was therefore willing, perhaps even prepared, to present it to world public opinion as an attempted defection to the West – contrary to Sablin's intentions. The Gulf of Riga can be left northward only through a narrow passage between the Estonian islands of Saaremaa and Hiiumaa and the mainland. A ship making for Leningrad from Riga that wishes to avoid such confined conditions must initially head west toward the Swedish island of Gotland. Sablin steered this course, which could give the mistaken impression that the Storozhevoy was heading to Sweden or even NATO-member Denmark instead of Leningrad. Until the end of the Cold War, Western intelligence believed that the crew had planned to defect.

Gregory D. Young was the first Westerner to investigate the mutiny as part of his 1982 Masters thesis Mutiny on Storozhevoy: A Case Study of Dissent in the Soviet Navy, and later in the book The Last Sentry by Young and Nate Braden. The thesis was placed in the United States Naval Academy archives where it was read by Tom Clancy, then an insurance salesman, who used it as inspiration to write The Hunt for Red October.

Quotes

External links

References

Bibliography 
 

1939 births
1976 deaths
Anti-revisionists
Communist Party of the Soviet Union members
Deaths by firearm in Russia
Russian people executed by the Soviet Union
Executed Soviet people from Russia
People executed by the Soviet Union by firearm
People executed for treason against the Soviet Union
Soviet Navy officers
Soviet dissidents
People executed for mutiny
Soviet rehabilitations
Executed people from Saint Petersburg
Executed Russian people
Lenin Military Political Academy alumni